Cornelius Kipkoech Tuwei (born 24 May 1993) is a Kenyan middle-distance runner specialising in the 800 metres.

Personal bests
Outdoor
400 metres – 46.94 (Nairobi 2016)
800 metres – 1:43.76 (Heusden-Zolder 2021)
1000 metres – 2:16.89 (Székesfehérvár 2018)
1500 metres – 	3:35.34 (Berlin 2019)
Indoor
800 metres – 1:46.47 (Toruń 2021)
1500 metres – 	3:38.91 (Luxembourg 2021)

References

1993 births
Living people
Kenyan male middle-distance runners
Athletes (track and field) at the 2018 Commonwealth Games
Commonwealth Games competitors for Kenya
People from Nandi County
African Games silver medalists for Kenya
Athletes (track and field) at the 2019 African Games
African Games medalists in athletics (track and field)